ISP Purworejo stand for Ikatan Sepakbola Purworejo (en: Football Association Purworejo) is an Indonesian football club based in Purworejo, Central Java. They currently compete in the Liga 3.

History

ISP Purworejo is an member of PSSI Central Java Province Association. Since 2010s, ISP Purworejo only played at junior-level competitions, Soeratin Cup (U-18). But in 2021, they will also compete in Liga 3 and have a target to be a professional club and compete at the first-tier league in Indonesia, Liga 1.

During the Soeratin Cup, no achievement achieved by ISP. The best achievement was in 1986. ISP to qualify to Zone VI (Central Java-Yogyakarta). Unfortunately in the final, they defeated by Persipur Purwodadi and failed to advance to the final round that being played in Jakarta.

ISP participation in Division Three was the first time and carve performance is quite encouraging. Persekabpur is ranked 3rd and promotion to Division Two.

References

External links
Official fans site
 

Football clubs in Indonesia
Football clubs in Central Java
Association football clubs established in 1954
1954 establishments in Indonesia